Mélanie Blouin (born July 14, 1990) is a Canadian track and field athlete competing in the pole vault. She competed in the pole vault event at the 2012 Summer Olympics, where she finished in 19th place. Blouin was born in Alma, Quebec.

Achievements 
 2012: National Championships, Calgary, Canada (Olympic "A" Standard) – first place
 2012 NACAC Champion and record holder (4.35m)
 Quebec Provincial record holder - senior women's pole vault (indoor) 4.35m, (outdoor) 4.40m
 Personal best: 4.50 meters Bolton, Ontario, Canada, 2015

References

External links 

1990 births
Living people
Canadian female pole vaulters
Sportspeople from Quebec
People from Alma, Quebec
Olympic track and field athletes of Canada
Athletes (track and field) at the 2012 Summer Olympics
Pan American Games track and field athletes for Canada
Athletes (track and field) at the 2015 Pan American Games
Université Laval alumni